The , referred to as , is a cable railway line owned and operated by the Kintetsu Railway, a Japanese major private railway. The line connects Toriimae to Ikomasanjo, all of which are within Ikoma, Nara, Japan.

Basic data
Lines and distances:
Hōzanji Line: Toriimae - Hōzanji, 
Sanjō Line: Hōzanji - Ikoma-Sanjō, 
Gauge: 
Stations: 5
Double track line: Toriimae — Hōzanji
Quadruple at the passing loop
Vertical interval:
Hōzanji Line: 
Sanjō Line:

Overview

The Ikoma Cable Line is actually made up of two different lines;  between Toriimae and Hōzanji,  between Hōzanji and Ikoma-Sanjō. The Hōzanji Line is the oldest commercially operated funicular in Japan, opened in 1918. It runs to Hōzan-ji, a Shingon Buddhist temple. Sanjō Line climbs up Mount Ikoma, reaching Ikoma Sanjo Amusement Park.

The Hōzanji Line is the only double-track funicular in the country. Normally, only Hōzanji Line 1 and Sanjō Line are used. Hōzanji Line 2 is operated in holiday seasons, and for safety inspections of the Line 1. Since the Hōzanji Line runs along a fairly urbanized area, it also functions as a commuter line. However, the line does not accept PiTaPa, a smart card ticketing system, nor Surutto Kansai, a prepaid magnetic card ticketing system.

In 2021, the line became a Civil Engineering heritage site.

Rolling stocks
Hōzanji Line 1 used classical 1928 cars until 2000, when they were replaced by the current fancy-decorated cars. Since then, bulldog-faced "Bull" and calico cat-faced "Mike" serve the line, both officially being Type Ko 11. Sanjō Line uses organ-like "Do-Re-Mi", cake-decorated "Sweet", both officially Type Ko 15. Hōzanji Line 2 uses ordinary-shaped Type Ko 3 cars, nicknamed "Yume-Ikoma".

Stations

See also
 Cable car
Funicular railway
List of funicular railways
List of railway lines in Japan
Mt. Ikoma

References

Ikoma Cable Line
Rail transport in Nara Prefecture
Funicular railways in Japan
1067 mm gauge railways in Japan
Railway lines opened in 1918
1918 establishments in Japan